Kalinga, is a historical region of India. It is generally defined as the eastern coastal region between the Mahanadi and the Godavari rivers, although its boundaries have fluctuated with the territory of its rulers. The core territory of Kalinga now encompasses a large part of Odisha and northeastern part of Andhra Pradesh. At its widest extent, the Kalinga region also included parts of present-day Chhattisgarh, extending up to Amarkantak in the west.

The Kalingas have been mentioned as a major tribe in the legendary text Mahabharata. In the 3rd century BCE, the region came under Mauryan control as a result of the Kalinga War. It was subsequently ruled by several regional dynasties whose rulers bore the title Kalingādhipati ("Lord of Kalinga"); these dynasties included Mahameghavahana, Vasishtha, Mathara, Pitrbhakta, Shailodbhava, Somavamshi, and Eastern Ganga. The medieval era rulers to rule over the Kalinga region were the Suryavamsa Gajapatis, Bhoi dynasty, Paralakhemundi Gangas and the zamindaris of Ganjam and Vizagapatam.

Extent 
{
	"type": "FeatureCollection",
	"features": [
		{
			"type": "Feature",
			"properties": { "marker-symbol": "monument", "title": "Amarakantaka" },
			"geometry": { "type": "Point", "coordinates": [81.753221, 22.682229] }
		},
		{
			"type": "Feature",
			"properties": { "marker-symbol": "monument", "title": "Mouth of Godavari" },
			"geometry": { "type": "Point", "coordinates": [82.343778, 16.729472] }
		},
		{
			"type": "Feature",
			"properties": { "marker-symbol": "monument", "title": "Mouth of Mahanadi" },
			"geometry": { "type": "Point", "coordinates": [86.708896, 20.295211] }
		}
	]
}

The Kalinga region is generally defined as the eastern coastal region between the Mahanadi and the Godavari rivers. However, its exact boundaries have fluctuated at various times in the history. According to political scientist Sudama Misra, the Kalinga janapada originally comprised the area covered by the Puri and Ganjam districts.

In the ancient Indian literature, the Kalinga region is associated with the Mahendragiri mountain located in the Ganjam district of Odisha, near its border with Andhra Pradesh.

At times, the southern border of Kalinga extended further up to the Krishna river. In the north, it sometimes extended beyond the Mahandi river, up to the Vaitarani river. The Kalinga region did not encompass the whole of present-day Odisha: the north-eastern part of Odisha was included in the distinct Utkala region. Utkala gradually lost its identity, and came to be considered as a part of Kalinga.

The eastern boundary of Kalinga was formed by the sea (the Bay of Bengal). Its western boundary is difficult to pinpoint, as it varied with the political power of its rulers. However, the Puranic literature suggests that Kalinga extended up to the Amarakantaka hills in the west.

Several ancient inscriptions mention the term "Trikalinga", which has been interpreted in several ways. According to one theory, Trikalinga refers to the widest extent of Kalinga. However, the Eastern Chalukya records suggest that Kalinga and Trikalinga were two distinct regions, with Trikalinga denoting the hilly region to the west of Kalinga.

The Kaliṅga kingdom proper was located on the coast of the Bay of Bengal, with the river Vaitaraṇī as its border in the north, while in the south it was bounded by the country of the Āndhras, although its southern border varied often and reached Elamanchili and Cheepurupalli in the Visakhapatnam district or even Piṣṭapura or Pithapuram to the north-east of the Godāvarī river, although it did not reach the river itself, which was in Āndhra territory. On the west, Kaliṅga had established its suzerainty over the tribes in inland hills so that its authority reached till the Amarakaṇṭaka range.

History

Antiquity 
The name of the region is derived from a tribe of the same name. According to the legendary text Mahabharata, the progenitors of the Kalingas and of their neighbouring tribes were brothers. These neighbours included the Angas, the Vangas, the Pundras, and the Suhmas.

The Kalingas occupied the extensive territory stretching from river Baitarani in Odisha to the Varahanandi in the Visakhapatnam district. Its capital in the ancient times was the city of Dantakura or Dantapura (now Dantavaktra fort near Chicacole in the Srikakulam district, washed by the river Languliya or Langulini).

The kingdom of Kaliṅga was already existent at the time of the Brahmana texts, which mention its king Karaṇḍu as a contemporary of Nagnajit of Gāndhāra and of Bhīma of Vidarbha.

Kaliṅga was mentioned by both Pāṇini and Baudhāyana, with the latter considering it as an part of Bharata Khanda.

Ancient Kalinga : Kalinga Kingdom (c. 1100 – 261 BCE)

Kalinga dynasty (I) (c. 1100 – 700 BCE) 

According to Mahabharata and some Puranas, the prince 'Kalinga' founded the Kalinga Kingdom, in the current day region of coastal Odisha, including the North Sircars. The Mahabharata also mentions one 'Srutayudha' as the king of the Kalinga kingdom, who joined the Kaurava camp. In the Buddhist text, Mahagovinda Suttanta, Kalinga and its ruler, 'Sattabhu', have been mentioned.
Known rulers are-
 King Kalinga, (founder of Kalinga Kingdom)
 King Odra, (founder of Odra Kingdom)
 Srutayudha
 Srutayush
 Manimat
 Chitrangada
 Subahu
 Virasena
 Sudatta
 Nalikira
 Yavanaraj
 Dantavakkha or Dantavakhra (c. 9th century BCE)
 Avakinnayo Karakandu (c. late 9th to early 8th century BCE)
 Vasupala (c. 8th century BCE)

Kalinga dynasty (II) (c. 700 – 350 BCE) 

This dynasty is mentioned in Chullakalinga Jataka and Kalingabodhi Jataka. The last ruler of First Kalinga dynasty is said to have broken away from the Danda kingdom along with the kings of Asmaka and Vidarbha as its feudal states, and established rule of Second Kalinga dynasty.
Known rulers are-
 Dandaki
 Mahakalinga
 Chullakalinga
 Kalinga II (c. 7th – 6th century BCE)

Other or late Kalinga rulers according to Dāṭhavaṃsa are-

This was probably another dynasty or late rulers of Second Kalinga dynasty, which is mentioned in Dāṭhavaṃsa.
Known rulers are-
 Brahmadatta (c. 6th – 5th century BCE)
 Sattabhu
 Kasiraja
 Sunanda
 Guhasiva

Suryavamsha of Kalinga (c. 350 – 261 BCE) 
Known rulers are-
 Brahmaadittiya (c. 4th century BCE)
His son, prince 'Soorudasaruna-Adeettiya' was exiled and as per Maldivian history, established the first kingdom Dheeva Maari and laid the foundation of the Adeetta dynasty (Aditta Vansa).
Unknown rulers
 Unknown (till 261 BCE), ruler of Kalinga at time of Mauryan annexation of Kalinga.

Pre-classical Kalinga

Annexation by Nanda Empire (c. 345 – 322 BCE) 

Kalinga was believed to be briefly annexed by Nanda ruler Mahapadma Nanda between 345 to 340 BCE.

The Nanda empire appears to have stretched from present-day Punjab in the west to Odisha (Kalinga) in the east. Nandas control of Kalinga region is corroborated by the Hathigumpha inscription of the later king Kharavela (c. 2nd or 1st century BCE).

When Chandragupta Maurya rebelled against the Nandas, Kalingas broke away from the empire of Magadha in 322 BCE.

Hathigumpha Inscription of Kalinga 

The Hathigumpha inscription suggests that a king named Nandaraja had excavated an aqueduct there in the past. Assuming that Nandaraja refers to a king of the Nanda dynasty, it appears that the Kalinga region was annexed by the Nandas at some point. It appears to have become independent again after the fall of the Nandas. It is described as "Calingae" in Megasthenes' Indica (3rd century BCE):

Kalinga War and annexation by Maurya Empire (c. 261 – 225 BCE) 

Ashoka invaded Kalinga in 261 BCE and re-annexed into Magadha Empire.
After the final battle near the Dhauli hills, the capital Tosali fell to the Mauryas where the headquarters of the Mauryan province of Kalinga was also located.
Kalinga broke away from the Mauryan empire during the rule of Dasharatha in 224 BCE.

Mahameghavahana Empire (c. 224 BCE – 250 CE) 

After the decline of the Mauryan Empire, the region came under the control of the Mahameghavahana family, whose king Kharavela described himself as the "supreme Lord of Kalinga". Kharavela was the greatest ruler of empire who ruled during the second or first century BCE and the primary source for his reign is sourced from the rock-cut Hathigumpha inscription. The inscription describes yearly records of his reign and also credits him with public infrastructure projects, welfare activities, patronage of the arts, and many military victories and also patronising religions such as Jainism while the inscription also describes him as a devotee of all religions.

Post-classical Kalinga

Gupta Empire 

Kalinga came under Gupta suzerainty in the 4th century CE. After the Gupta withdrawal, it was ruled by several minor dynasties, whose rulers bore the title Kalingadhipati ("Lord of Kalinga"). These included the Matharas, Pitrbhaktas, Vasishthas and Nalas. They were followed by the Shailodbhavas and the early Eastern Gangas.

Shailodbhava dynasty 

In the 7th century, the Shailodbhavas ruled parts of eastern India and their core territory was known as Kongoda-mandala, and included parts of the present-day Ganjam, Khordha and Puri districts. King Madhavaraja II claimed the title Sakala-Kalingadhipati ("the lord of the entire Kalinga"). During the 8th-10th centuries, the Bhauma-Kara dynasty ruled the region, although they called their kingdom "Tosala" (derived from Tosali, the ancient capital of Kalinga).

Somavamshi or Keshari dynasty

The Somavamshis ruled parts of present-day Odisha in eastern India between the 9th and the 12th centuries with their capitals included Yayatinagara and Abhinava-Yayatinagara (modern Jajpur). They ruled the Dakshina Kosala region claiming the title Kosalendra ("lord of Kosala"), following which they conquered the Kalinga and the Utkala regions in present-day Odisha, succeeding the Bhauma-Karas. Thus they ​called themselves the lord of Kalinga, Kosala, and Utkala. They also introduced a new style of art and architecture in Odisha.

Medieval Kalinga

Eastern Ganga Empire

During the 11th-15th century, the Eastern Gangas became the dominant power in the region, and bore the title Kalingadhipati. After succeeding the Somavanshis, they assumed various titles viz. Trikalingadhipathi or Sakala Kalingadhipathi (Lord of three Kalinga or all three Kalingas namely Kalinga proper (South), Utkala (North), and Dakshina Kosala (West)). Their capital was originally located at Kalinganagara (modern Mukhalingam), and was later transferred to Kataka (modern Cuttack) during the reign of Anantavarman Chodaganga in the 12th century. He also built the famous Jagannath Temple at Puri.

Following repeated invasions from the northern regions, Narasimhadeva I, the son of Anangabhima Deva III, invaded southern Bengal in 13th cen., defeated its ruler, captured the capital (Gauda), and built the Sun Temple at Konark to commemorate his victory. Narasimhadeva I was also the first king to use the title of Gajapati or Lord of war elephants or King with an army of elephants among the Odishan kings in the 1246 CE inscription at the Kapilash Temple. With the death of Narasimha in 1264, the Eastern Gangas began to decline and were succeeded by the Suryavamsi Gajapatis in 1434.

Gajapati Empire

The last Eastern Ganga ruler Bhanudeva IV was dethroned by Kapilendra Deva in 1435. This event marked the foundation of the Gajapati Empire that ruled over the regions of Utkala (North Odisha) and Kalinga (South Odisha, North Andhra Pradesh). Prataparudra Deva was the last great king of the Suryavamsi Gajapatis and soon after his death his minister Govinda Vidyadhara usurped the throne and laid the foundation of the Bhoi dynasty. This dynasty was followed by the reign of the Chalukya Gajapati Mukunda Deva who was the last independent ruler of the realm. The fall of the Gajapatis meant the weakening of the centralised authority in the region and the subsequent fragmentation and independence of the tributary and feudal states.

Influence
The merchant Kaundinya I, who became the co-founder of the Funan kingdom (centered in modern Cambodia) after he married the local Nāga princess Soma also has his origins from the ancient Kalinga region.

According to scholar R. C. Majumdar, the 8th century CE Shailendra dynasty of Java likely originated from Kalinga and the dynasty was also powerful in Cambodia and Champa(Annam) region. The Shailendras are considered to have been a thalassocracy and ruled vast swathes of maritime Southeast Asia and the dynasty appeared to be the ruling family of both the Mataram Kingdom of Central Java, for some period and the Srivijaya Kingdom in Sumatra.

Burma went by the name of Kalinga-rattha (likely observed in the old Indo-Chinese records for Pegu) and there is evidence of very early merchant settlements and Buddhist missions in the southern Mon regions and by the 2nd century CE, the rule of Kalinga migrants centered around Kale, the Arakan River valley and Pegu, around the Gulf of Martaban. The remains of a ship excavated at Tante, near Yangon is thought to have belonged to Kalingan traders. Place names and similarities in architecture also indicate close contacts across the Gulf of Bengal.

As per Maldivian history, the first kingdom Dheeva Maari was established before 3rd century BC by Soorudasaruna-Adeettiya of the Solar dynasty, an exiled prince and son of King Brahmaadittiya of the Kalinga Kingdom and laid the foundation of the Adeetta dynasty.

In the Philippines according to researcher Eric Casino, the chief (or "king") of Butuan was called as Kiling, is not Visayan in origin but rather Indian, as Kiling is referred to the people of India similar to the word Keling which was used in the nearby Malay regions.

Derived from Kalinga is the still current term Keling or Kling, used in parts of Southeast Asia to denote a person of the Indian subcontinent or Indian diaspora and at present having some derogatory and pejorative connotations, especially in Malaysia. The 16th-century Portuguese traveller Castanheda wrote of the Keling community in Melaka who lived in the northern part of the city of Malacca(Melaka). The merchants were known as Quelins (Kling, the people of Kalinga from India).

See also 

 History of Odisha
 List of rulers of Odisha
 Kalinga script, derived from Brahmi script
 Keling
 Kalingga Kingdom

References

Citations

Sources 

 
 
 
 
 
 
 
 
 
 
 
 
 

Historical Indian regions
Kalinga (India)
History of Odisha
History of Andhra Pradesh
Former monarchies